The Academy is a collaborative EP by Rich Music, Panamanian singer Sech and American singer Dalex featuring American-Puerto Rican singer Justin Quiles, Puerto Rican singer Lenny Tavárez and Colombian singer Feid, released on October 11, 2019, through Rich Music. The project was produced mainly by Dímelo Flow with producers Jowan, Pedro "SP" Polanco, Rike Mike, Simon, Swifft, Slow Mike, ICE and DVLP having production credits in some tracks. The EP also features collaborations with singers Wisin, Cazzu, De La Ghetto, Zion & Lennox and Mariah Angeliq.

The album peaked at number 11 at the Top Latin Albums chart and was certified platinum in United States.

Background
The project is composed of seven tracks and is a collaborative EP of reggaeton singers Sech, Dalex, Justin Quiles, Lenny Tavárez and Feid with independent label Rich Music, of which all of them are signed to except Tavárez and Feid. The idea of the album was inspired by the Avengers, a fictional team of superheroes, and came during the recording of the remix for "Pa Mí", a song by Dalex that features artists like Sech and Lenny Tavárez, according to Rich Mendez, CEO of Rich Music, "when Flow, Lenny, and Dalex got together for the remix of "Pa Mí" and "Cuaderno", they gave each other the names of characters from The Avengers, playing around in the studio, this idea persisted and when Sech and Dalex entered the studio for their EP, the superhero concept took on a life of its own with each featured act bringing their own strength, The Avengers later morphed into The Academy".

Singles
The song "Quizás" featuring Wisin and Zion from Zion & Lennox was released as a single on September 20, 2019, the song peaked at numbers 41 and 31 at the Hot Latin Songs and the Argentina Hot 100 charts, respectively, additionally, the single was certified platinum in United States in 2020.

Track listing

Charts

Certifications

References

2019 albums
Collaborative albums